This is a list of Japanese football J1 League transfers in the summer transfer window 2018 by club.

Ventforet Kofu

In:

Out:

Albirex Niigata

In:

Out:

Omiya Ardija

In:

Out:

Avispa Fukuoka

In:

Out:

Tokyo Verdy

In:

Out:

JEF United Chiba

In:

Out:

Tokushima Vortis

In:

Out:

Matsumoto Yamaga

In:

Out:

Oita Trinita

In:

Out:

Yokohama FC

In:

Out:

Montedio Yamagata

In:

Out:

Kyoto Sanga

In:

Out:

Fagiano Okayama

In:

Out:

Mito HollyHock

In:

Out:

Ehime FC

In:

Out:

Machida Zelvia

In:

Out:

Zweigen Kanazawa

In:

Out:

FC Gifu

In:

Out:

Kamatamare Sanuki

In:

Out:

Renofa Yamaguchi

In:

Out:

Roasso Kumamoto

In:

Out:

Tochigi SC

In:

Out:

References

2018
Transfers
Japan